The 1985 Major League Baseball postseason was the playoff tournament of Major League Baseball for the 1985 season. The winners of each division advance to the postseason and face each other in a League Championship Series to determine the pennant winners that face each other in the World Series. This was the first postseason in which the LCS was expanded to a 7-game series, from 1969 to 1984 it was a 5-game series. 

In the American League, the Kansas City Royals returned to the postseason for the seventh time in ten years, and the Toronto Blue Jays made their first postseason appearance in franchise history. This was the last time that the Royals appeared in the postseason until 2014.

In the National League, the St. Louis Cardinals returned to the postseason for the second time in five years, and the Los Angeles Dodgers were making their fifth appearance in the last nine years. 

The playoffs began on October 8, 1985, and concluded on October 27, 1985, with the Royals defeating the Cardinals in seven games in the 1985 World Series. This was the first title in franchise history for the Royals.

Playoff seeds
The following teams qualified for the postseason:

American League
 Toronto Blue Jays - 99–62, Clinched AL East
 Kansas City Royals - 91–71, Clinched AL West

National League
 St. Louis Cardinals - 101–61, Clinched NL East
 Los Angeles Dodgers - 95–67, Clinched NL West

Playoff bracket

American League Championship Series

Toronto Blue Jays vs. Kansas City Royals

This was the first postseason meeting between the Blue Jays and Royals, and the only postseason series ever played at Exhibition Stadium. The Royals overcame a 3-1 series deficit to defeat the Blue Jays in seven games and return to the World Series for the second time in seven years.

In Toronto, the Blue Jays won Game 1 by a 6-1 score thanks to a stellar pitching performance by Dave Stieb, who pitched eight innings. The Blue Jays then took Game 2 in extra innings to go up 2-0 in the series headed to Kansas City. In Game 3, the Royals rallied from a late deficit to avoid a sweep, however the Blue Jays narrowly won Game 4 to take a 3-1 series lead. The Royals' Danny Jackson pitched a complete game shutout in Game 5 to send the series back to Toronto, where the Royals would take Game 6 to force a seventh game. In Game 7, the Royals jumped out to an early lead and did not relinquish it, winning by a 6-2 score to secure the pennant.

This was the first of three consecutive losses in the ALCS for the Blue Jays - in 1989 they fell to the Oakland Athletics in five games, and in 1991 they fell to the Minnesota Twins, also in five games. They would win their first pennant in 1992 over the Athletics in six games.

This was the last time the Royals won the AL pennant until 2014, where they swept the Baltimore Orioles before falling in the World Series. The Royals and Blue Jays would meet again thirty years later in the 2015 ALCS, which the Royals won in six games en route to another World Series title.

National League Championship Series

Los Angeles Dodgers vs. St. Louis Cardinals

This was the first postseason meeting between the Dodgers and Cardinals. The Cardinals overcame a 2-0 series deficit to win the series in six games and advance to the World Series for the second time in five years.

The Dodgers took Game 1 as Fernando Valenzuela out-dueled the Cardinals' John Tudor, and in Game 2, Orel Hershiser pitched a complete game as the Dodgers blew out the Cardinals to take a 2-0 series lead headed to St. Louis. The Cardinals got on the board in the series with a 4-2 victory in Game 3. In Game 4, Tudor pitched seven solid innings as the Cardinals blew out the Dodgers by ten runs to tie the series at two. Game 5 remained tied until the bottom of the ninth, when St. Louis' Ozzie Smith hit a walk-off home run to give the Cardinals a 3-2 win and a 3-2 series lead headed back to Los Angeles. Game 6 was an offensive duel - the Cardinals came back to tie the game at four in the top of the seventh, then the Dodgers' regained the lead in the bottom of the eighth thanks to a solo home run from Mike Marshall. The Dodgers were then three outs away from forcing a Game 7, but the Cardinals put two men on base (one coming from a walk) and then Jack Clark hit a three-run home run to put the Cardinals ahead for good. The demoralized Dodgers then had a one-two-three ninth as the Cardinals won to take the pennant.

The Dodgers and Cardinals would play each other five more times in the playoffs - St. Louis won in the NLDS in 2004 and 2014, as well as the NLCS in 2013, while Los Angeles won in the NLDS in 2009 and the 2021 NL Wild Card Game. The Dodgers returned to the postseason in 1988, where they upset the New York Mets in seven games in the NLCS en route to a World Series title.

1985 World Series

Kansas City Royals (AL) vs. St. Louis Cardinals (NL) 

This was the first World Series since 1974 to feature two teams representing the same state, and the first all-Missouri World Series since 1944, which featured the Cardinals and the St. Louis Browns (now the Baltimore Orioles). The Royals defeated the Cardinals in seven games to capture their first World Series title in franchise history. The Royals became the fifth team in World Series history to come back from a 3-1 series deficit to win the championship, and only the second expansion team to win a World Series after the New York Mets. The Royals also became the first team in MLB history to win both the ALCS and the World Series after trailing three games to one in both rounds. This was the first major league championship won by a team from Kansas City since 1970, when the Kansas City Chiefs won Super Bowl IV.

The Cardinals took Games 1 and 2 in Kansas City. When the series moved to St. Louis, the Royals got on the board with a 6-1 victory in Game 3 thanks to excellent pitching from Bret Saberhagen, however the Cardinals would win Game 4 off a complete game shutout performance from John Tudor to take a three games to one series lead. The Royals again won 6-1 in Game 5 to send the series back to Kansas City. Game 6 of the series was marred by a controversial call in which first batter and pinch-hitter Jorge Orta, sent a chopping bouncer to the right of Jack Clark. He tossed the ball to Worrell, who tagged the bag ahead of Orta, but Clark's toss was behind Worrell and it allowed the running Orta to come between umpire Don Denkinger and his view of the lunging Worrell's glove. Denkinger called Orta safe. TV replays  - not used by officials for play review until 2008 - indicated that Orta should have been called out, and an argument ensued on the field. The Cardinals argued briefly but as crew chief and believing he had made the correct call, Denkinger would not reverse it. Orta remained at first. In his book You're Missing a Great Game, Herzog wrote that he later wished he had asked Commissioner Peter Ueberroth, who was in attendance, to overrule the call and declare Orta out. If Ueberroth had refused to do so, Herzog would have pulled his team from the field and forfeited the game. The Royals ended up winning 2-1 to force a seventh game. In Game 7, Saberhagen pitched a five-hit complete game shutout as the Royals embarrassed the Cardinals, 11-0, to secure the title. 

After the series win, the Royals fell into a massive slump, and missed the postseason for the next 29 years. Their next postseason appearance would come in 2014, where they returned to the World Series, but narrowly lost to the San Francisco Giants in seven games. The Royals' next World Series title would come in 2015, where they defeated the New York Mets in five games.

The Cardinals' next World Series appearance would come in 1987, where they lost to the Minnesota Twins in seven games. They would not win the title again until 2006, where they defeated the Detroit Tigers in five games.

References

External links
 League Baseball Standings & Expanded Standings - 1985

 
Major League Baseball postseason